Starlight Theatre may refer to:

Starlight Theatre (Kansas City, Missouri),
Rock Valley College Starlight Theatre, which performs at the Bengt Sjostrom Theatre (Rockford, Illinois)
Rock Valley College Studio Theatre (Rockford, Illinois), an indoor theatre often conflated with the outdoor Rock Valley College Starlight Theatre
Bengt Sjostrom Theatre, the theatre complex that houses the Rock Valley College Starlight Theatre
Starlight Theatre (TV series), an American anthology drama series that aired on CBS from 1950 to 1951

See also
 Starlight Bowl (San Diego), also called Starlight Musical Theatre
 Starlight (disambiguation)